Vermelles British Cemetery is a First World War British war cemetery at Vermelles, a village 10 kilometres north-west of Lens, Pas-de-Calais. The cemetery was designed by Sir Herbert Baker and contains the memorials to 2145 casualties.

References

External links
 
 

Lens, Pas-de-Calais
Commonwealth War Graves Commission cemeteries in France
World War I cemeteries in France